Lucas Lacamp (born June 4, 2001) is a rugby union player. He has played as a center for the United States national rugby sevens team since 2021.

Lacamp lived in Hong Kong and England in his youth, where he learned to play rugby. Lacamp represented Hong Kong at the 2019 World Rugby under-20 tournament. Lacamp in 2019 also played for the USA High School All-Americans team. He attended university in the United States, playing rugby with the UCLA Bruins.

U.S. national team
Lacamp debuted for the U.S. on the 2021–22 World Rugby Sevens Series at the December 2021 Dubai Sevens. Lacamp was recognized for his performance at the May 2022 France Sevens, where he was nominated as one of the impact players of the tournament and described as a rising star.

Lacamp represented the United States at the 2022 Rugby World Cup Sevens in Cape Town.

References

American rugby union players
Living people
2001 births